Michel Costa da Silva (born 20 December 2001) is a Brazilian professional footballer who plays as a midfielder for MLS Next Pro club New England Revolution II.

Career

Youth
Maciel spent eight years with the Botafogo academy. He appeared in 42 games and scored 2 goals for Botafogo's under-20 side.

New England Revolution II
On 8 December 2020, Michel joined USL League One side New England Revolution II ahead of their 2021 season. He made his professional debut on 17 April 2021, appearing as a 68th-minute substitute during a 3–0 loss to Richmond Kickers.

References

External links
 

2001 births
Living people
Brazilian footballers
Brazilian expatriate footballers
Brazilian expatriate sportspeople in the United States
Expatriate soccer players in the United States
Association football midfielders
New England Revolution II players
USL League One players
Footballers from Rio de Janeiro (city)
MLS Next Pro players